Charles Henry Varnum (July 9, 1933February 26, 1999) was a Republican member of the Michigan House of Representatives, representing a portion of the Upper Peninsula for 26 years.

A native of Jonesville, Varnum attended Ferris Institute and Hillsdale College. While at Hillsdale, Varnum became a member of Delta Tau Delta. He served in the Marines during the Korean War. Varnum then moved to Manistique and was a teacher, a member of the Schoolcraft County board of supervisors, and a member of the Manistique city council. He was elected to the House in 1966.

After leaving the House in 1982, Varnum became Manistique city manager and served there until his retirement in 1988. He was a member of Rotary, the Elks, the American Legion, and the V.F.W. Varnum died on February 26, 1999, aged 65.

References

1933 births
1999 deaths
People from Jonesville, Michigan
People from Schoolcraft County, Michigan
Hillsdale College alumni
Ferris State University alumni
Northern Michigan University alumni
Educators from Michigan
Michigan city council members
County commissioners in Michigan
Republican Party members of the Michigan House of Representatives
20th-century American politicians